Pannuru Sripathi  (born April 20, 1943) in a small village near Tirupathi, Andhra Pradesh, India, is a traditional painter who won the Padma Shri Award in 2007. Sripathi obtained a diploma in Drawing in 1969. Sripathi has served the traditional craft by training more than 1000 younger generations and art lovers in India and abroad. Sripathi represented India in Japan, Russia, USA, Singapore, Austria, and Germany for festival of India.

Awards and accolades

 State Award 1986
 National Award 2001
Shilp Guru Award 2006 (Tanjore Style Painting)
 Padma Shri Award 2007
 Shilp Guru Award 2008

References

1943 births
Living people
Indian male painters
20th-century Indian painters
Recipients of the Padma Shri in arts
People from Tirupati
Painters from Andhra Pradesh
20th-century Indian male artists